= Asen Asenov =

Bulgarian scientist and entrepreneur in the field of microelectronics

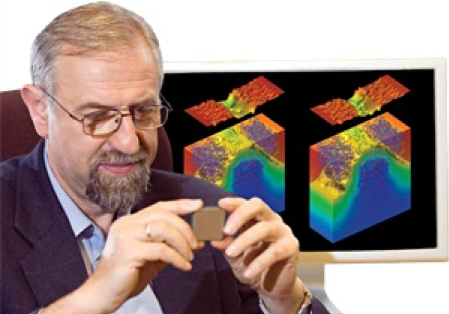
- Born: January 30, 1954 (age 72)
- Occupations: Scientist and entrepreneur

Asen Asenov (born 30 January 1954, in Sofia) is a Bulgarian scientist and entrepreneur in the field of microelectronics and device modelling and has focused on Technology Computer Aided design (TCAD). Currently he is the James Watt Chair in Electrical Engineering at the University of Glasgow and the Leader of the Glasgow Device Modeling Group.

== Biography ==
Asen Asenov (FIEEE, FRSE) received his M.Sc. degree in solid state physics from Sofia University, Bulgaria in 1979 and a PhD degree in physics from The Bulgarian Academy of Science in 1989. He has ten years of industrial experience as a head of the Process and Device Modelling Group in the Institute of Microelectronics, Sofia. In 1989–1991 he was a visiting professor at the Physics Department of Technical University of Munich, Germany. He joined the Department of Electronics and Electrical Engineering at the University of Glasgow in 1991, and served as a Head of Department in 1999–2003. He was appointed as the James Watt Professor in Electrical Engineering in 2003.

== Accomplishments ==
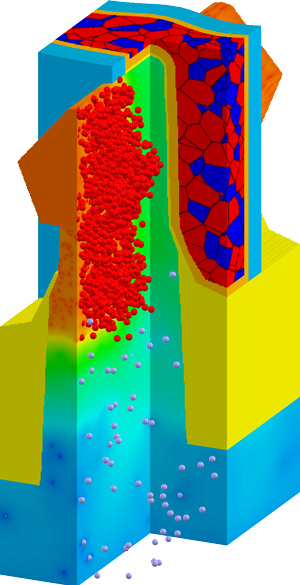
FinFet transistor with sources of variability

As a head of the Device Modelling Group in the institute of Microelectronics Asenov and his colleague Evgeni Stefanov developed the first integrated two dimensional TCAD Process and Device Simulators IMPEDANCE. Little know in the western world due to the Iron Curtain IMPEDANCE was licensed and used in USSR, Poland and East Germany. As a head of the Department of Electronics and Electrical engineering, together with Professor Chris Wilkinson he played instrumental role in the establishment of the James Watt Nanofabrication Centre. Asenov works on understanding the impact of the statistical variability associated with the discreteness of charge and granularity of matter as a maker or breaker of the contemporary and future CMOS technology. He directed the development of the first ‘atomistic’ TCAD simulator GARAND.

== Entrepreneurship ==
Asenov was a co-founder, CEO and a qualifying director of Gold Standard Simulations (GSS) Ltd. Apart from selling GARAND licences, GSS developed the first TCAD based Design Technology Co-Optimisation (DTCO) tool chain. The GSS customer basis grew up rapidly including most of the major semiconductor players. In 2016 GSS was acquired by Synopsys resulting in the establishment of the Synopsys TCAD R&D centre in Glasgow. Asenov is also the founder and the CEO of Semiwise, a semiconductor technology and device IP company. He is a non-executive director of Surecore, along with Ashwin Kumaraswamy from Mercia Asset Management a memory IP company, and Ngenics, an EDA company.

== Awards ==
- In 1987 Asenov received an award from the Polit Buro of the Bulgarian Communist Party for the development of IMPEDANCE.
- In 2010 he received and R&D achievement award from the National Microelectronics Institute (UK) for the establishment of GSS.
- Asenov is a Fellow of the Royal Academy of Scotland and a Fellow of IEEE.
